Tosu (Xalbaakı) is a rural locality (a selo), the administrative centre of and one of two settlements, in addition to Starovatovo, in Khalbakinsky Rural Okrug of Vilyuysky District in the Sakha Republic, Russia. Its population as of the 2010 Census was 665, of whom 325 were male and 340 female, down from 731 as recorded during the 2002 Census.

References

Notes

Sources
Official website of the Sakha Republic. Registry of the Administrative-Territorial Divisions of the Sakha Republic. Vilyuysky District. 

Rural localities in Vilyuysky District